Michael Martchenko (born August 1, 1942) is a Canadian illustrator best known for illustrating many of the stories of Robert Munsch.

Life
Born in Carcassonne, France, Michael moved to Canada when he was seven, where he graduated from the Ontario College of Art. His early interest in drawing became apparent when he began creating his own depictions of his favourite comic books. Mike's fame in high school, Glenview Park Secondary School, Cambridge, Ontario, was based on the realistic "flip page" comics that adorned every one of his school texts and workbooks.

Martchenko and his wife, Patricia, live in Toronto's Leaside.

Work
Although Martchenko began his career as a commercial artist, he was later approached by Robert Munsch and Annick Press representatives to consider a career in children's book illustrating after they saw his work at a graphic arts exhibition. His first Munsch book was 1980's The Paper Bag Princess after his six-year-old daughter read the story; he is now the go-to illustrator for Munsch books.

In 1984, Martchenko began his artistic partnership with Allen Morgan, author of the "Matthew’s Midnight Adventure" series. It was not until 1990 that he first authored and illustrated his own book, Birdfeeder Banquet. His second self-authored and illustrated book, Ma, I’m a Farmer, was published in 2003.

Martchenko's most famous works are made in partnership with Canadian Author Robert Munsch on their long lived partnership Martchenko has said "I think that respecting each other's talents and experience, plus good communication can go a long way to creating a positive work relationship. You need to be on the same page creatively and share the same desire to produce the best books that you can. Robert Munsch and Allen Morgan's stories are funny, zany, and at times, a little crazy – so I fit right in. My type of visual humour, which at times can be a little crazy also, seems to complement their stories. Being able to exchange ideas is important as well. I can suggest changes to copy and they can make suggestions to illustrations. If it improves the story, we're all okay with that. We like one another, we get along and egos don't get in the way. It's worked for all these years and still does."

Aside from his passion for illustrating children's books, Martchenko also has an interest in aviation and military art and history.

Books Illustrated by Michael Martchenko

As author
 Birdfeeder Banquet (1990)
 Ma, I’m a Farmer (2003)

As illustrator only
With Robert Munsch
 50 Below Zero
 Angela's Airplane
 The Boy in the Drawer
 The Dark
 David's Father
 The Fire Station
 From Far Away
 Hugs
 I Did It Because...
 I Have to Go!
 Jonathan Cleaned Up—Then He Heard a Sound
 Kiss Me, I'm Perfect
 Moira's Birthday
 Mortimer
 Murmel, Murmel, Murmel
 No clean clothes
 The Paper Bag Princess: 25th Anniversary Edition
 The Paper Bag Princess
 Pigs
 Playhouse
 Show and Tell
 Something Good
 Stephanie's Ponytail
 Thomas' Snowsuit
 Wait and See
 Smelly Socks
 Zoom

With Allen Morgan
 Matthew & the Midnight Tow Truck
 Matthew & the Midnight Turkeys
 Matthew & the Midnight Money Van
 Matthew & the Midnight Hospital
 Matthew & the Midnight Firefighter
 Matthew & the Midnight Wrecker
 Matthew & the Midnight Movie
 Matthew & the Midnight Flood

With Rick Rossiter
 Mixed Up Michael

References

External links 

 

1942 births
Living people
Canadian illustrators
Franco-Ontarian people
Canadian children's book illustrators
Canadian people of Ukrainian descent
People from Carcassonne